is a railway station on the Keikyu Airport Line in Ōta, Tokyo, Japan, operated by the private railway operator Keikyu. The station is numbered "KK13".

Lines

Station layout
The station has two underground opposed side platforms serving two tracks.

Platforms

History
The station opened on 28 June 1902. The station was rebuilt with underground platforms in 1997.

Keikyu introduced station numbering to its stations on 21 October 2010; Ōtorii was assigned station number KK13.

Passenger statistics
In fiscal 2011, the station was used by an average of 27,342 passengers daily.

Surrounding area
Sega's headquarters were once located near this station until 2018, when it was relocated to the Sumitomo Fudosan Osaki Garden Tower in Shinagawa near Ōsaki Station.

See also
 List of railway stations in Japan

References

External links

  

Railway stations in Tokyo
Railway stations in Japan opened in 1902